Wilford Lane is a tram stop on the Nottingham Express Transit (NET) network, in the titular city, England. The stop takes its name from Wilford Lane and the village of Wilford, and lies on the boundary between the city of Nottingham and the district of Rushcliffe. The stop is on line 2 of the NET, from Phoenix Park via the city centre to Clifton, and trams run at frequencies that vary between 4 and 8 trams per hour, depending on the day and time of day.

The tram line and stop is located on the course of the former Great Central main line, which once linked London with Nottingham and Sheffield, but which closed in 1969. The railway line here ran on an embankment and crossed Wilford Lane on a low bridge, but the bridge was removed after closure to permit the operation of double deck buses. The remaining embankment at the stop location was removed as part of the preparation for the new line, and the tramway now crosses Wilford Lane on the level. To the north of the stop, the Great Central embankment is retained but unused, and the tram line runs at ground level to its east side. To the south of the stop, the tram line rises up to run along the top of the retained embankment.

The stop is on reserved track and comprises a pair of side platforms flanking the tracks. To the east of the stop is a secure works compound which is served by a tram siding that diverges from the main line to the south of the level crossing and crosses Wilford Lane separately.

Wilford Lane opened on 25 August 2015, along with the rest of NET's phase two.

Gallery

References

External links

Nottingham Express Transit stops
Railway stations in Great Britain opened in 2015
Transport in Rushcliffe